Excubitor may refer to:

 Excubitors, imperial guards of the early Byzantine emperors
 Lanius excubitor, a bird species known as great grey shrike
 8591 Excubitor, a main-belt asteroid